Hamilcar Publications is a Boston-based book publisher and a division of Hannibal Boxing Media LLC. Founded in 2018 by Kyle Sarofeen and Andy Komack, Hamilcar's titles focus on professional boxing, true crime, and hip-hop.

Hamilcar Publications is a member of the Independent Book Publishers Association (IBPA), New England Independent Booksellers Association (NEIBA), and Independent Publishers of New England (IPNE).

Books and authors

References

External links 

 Official website

Book publishing companies based in Massachusetts